Borussia Mönchengladbach II is a German association football club from the town of Mönchengladbach, North Rhine Westphalia. It is the reserve team of Borussia Mönchengladbach.

The team's greatest success has been promotion to the tier four Regionalliga West where it won a league championship in 2014–15. It has also taken part in the first round of the DFB-Pokal, the German Cup, on one occasion, courtesy to a Lower Rhine Cup win.

History
The team first won promotion to the highest league in the Lower Rhine region, the tier four Verbandsliga Niederrhein, in 1980. It played at this level for the next seventeen seasons, generally as a mid-table side. At regular intervals the side managed to finish third but only in 1997 was it finally able to win a league championship and earn promotion to the Oberliga Nordrhein. In the same season if finally earned promotion it won the Lower Rhine Cup and thereby qualified for the German Cup for the first and only time. It entered the 1997–98 DFB-Pokal where it lost 1–0 to VfB Stuttgart in the first round.

Borussia Mönchengladbach II played in the Oberliga for the next nine seasons, finishing in the top half of the table each year. After runners-up finishes in 2003 and 2005 the team won a league championship in 2006 and earned promotion to the tier three Regionalliga Nord. It played for one season in this league, was relegated and earned another Oberliga championship the year after to return to the Regionalliga. With the introduction of the 3. Liga in 2008 the Regionalligas were expanded from two to three and Borussia became part of the new Regionalliga West. After a good first season the team finished on a relegation rank in its second but was spared because of a number of Regionalliga teams having their license revoked. From 2010 onwards the side improved, achieving upper table finishes which culminated in a league championship in 2015. The latter qualified the team for the promotion round to the 3. Liga, where it missed out on promotion to SV Werder Bremen II.

Honours
The club's honours:

League
 Regionalliga West
 Champions: 2015
 Oberliga Nordrhein
 Champions: 2006, 2008
 Verbandsliga Niederrhein
 Champions: 1997
 Landesliga Niederrhein
 Champions: 1980

Cup
 Lower Rhine Cup 
 Winners: 1997

Recent seasons 
The recent season-by-season performance of the club:

 With the introduction of the Regionalligas in 1994 and the 3. Liga in 2008 as the new third tier, below the 2. Bundesliga, all leagues below dropped one tier.

Current squad

Squad U19

Squad U17

Squad U15

References

External links 
Official team site 
Borussia Mönchengladbach II at Weltfussball.de 

German reserve football teams
North Rhine-Westphalia reserve football teams
Reserve team
Premier League International Cup